Plumper Cove Marine Provincial Park is a provincial park in British Columbia, Canada.  The park is located on Keats Island in Howe Sound, northwest of Vancouver, British Columbia.

It is one of the oldest marine parks on the BC coast, and a popular anchorage in the summer months. The 57-hectare park is located on the northwest shore of Keats Island.

The park has a well maintained hiking trail system, a grassy upland picnic area and forested walk-in campsites.  The trail system consists of 'Keats Loop' which leads to the top of a bluff to a lookout, and then there is a  trail which leads to Keats' Landing, the final segment of which can be travelled either by dirt road or trail.  The  trail is of intermediate level, easy to hike when not laden with camping gear, but somewhat arduous when hiking in with several days worth of camping supplies.  It is roughly  uphill and  downhill either direction, and somewhat near the trail's middle it peaks near the lookout.

There are only two ways for the public to access the park; by marine access or by hiking in. The trail from Keats Landing to Plumper Cove Marine Park is NOT bike friendly, and most trails on the island are similarly challenging - bicycles are not recommended but good walking shoes will get you where you need to go! Alternately, via marine access, one with their own boat can navigate and pay moorage fees at the park dock. Several water taxi services are available from Gibsons to Plumper Cove Marine Park, but these are somewhat erratic and do not operate on a regular schedule, sometimes requiring a charter.

The park is known for its quiet and natural surroundings. Unlike many other provincial campgrounds which have vehicle access, traffic by locals there to drink and make loud noise is limited. Occasionally people from Gibsons, British Columbia or those who have cabins on Keats Island will park a barge or tie together a series of boats and have a private flotilla party, although this is rare and usually only occurs on peak long weekends.  Due to the natural surroundings, lack of vehicle access, and dedication or investment in a marine vehicle to get to the park, the park is lovingly referred to by those who frequent it regularly as "the best campground in BC".  Those from Vancouver, British Columbia who frequent the park tend to go back every year on the same weekends at the same time, and tend to not advertise to their fellow city dwellers about the park in order to keep it private and from it getting too busy.

From September 24 to May 15, the park does not charge camping fees, but has limited services available.  Normally, during peak summer months, the camping fee is $16 per night per party (party up to four).  There are group campsites available which are double sites for larger parties.  Group picknicking services are available by private reservation only.  Moorage at a buoy costs $12 per night, and moorage at the dock costs $2.00 per metre per night. Docking and moorage fees only apply after 6pm.  During the winter months most services are free of charge.  Garbage service is very limited (if at all) and visitors should plan to pack out anything they may bring.

The park has potable water available from a hand pump only from May 15th to Sep 15th and the pit toilets are open year around.

Due to storm damage in the winter of 2006 the dock at the Park was destroyed, and replaced in 2007.

External links

"Plumper Cove Marine Provincial Park:  BC Parks 

Provincial parks of British Columbia
Sunshine Coast Regional District
1960 establishments in British Columbia
Protected areas established in 1960
Marine parks of Canada